Colin Dann (born 10 March 1943) is an English author. He is best known for his The Animals of Farthing Wood series of books, which was subsequently made into an animated series.

Dann worked at the publishing firm William Collins, Sons & Co. for thirteen years, and his first novel, The Animals of Farthing Wood, was written during this period. The original cover for this and a dozen others was painted by Portal artist Frances Broomfield.

Books
Farthing Wood series
 The Animals of Farthing Wood (1979)
 In the Grip of Winter (1981)
 Fox's Feud (1982)
 The Fox Cub Bold (1983)
 The Siege of White Deer Park (1985)
 In the Path of the Storm (1989)
 Battle for the Park (1992)
 Farthing Wood - The Adventure Begins (1994)

King of the Vagabonds series
 King of the Vagabonds (1987)
 The City Cats (1992)
 Copycat (1997)

Other books
The Ram of Sweetriver (1986)
 The Beach Dogs (1988)
 Just Nuffin (1990)
 A Great Escape (1990)
 Legacy of Ghosts (1991)
Nobody's Dog (1999)

The Lions of Lingmere series
Journey to Freedom (1999)
Lion Country (2000)
Pride of the Plains (2002)

References

External links
 SciFan Colin Dann Bibliography

1943 births
Living people
20th-century English novelists
21st-century English novelists
English children's writers
People from Richmond, London